A.L. Alexander's Goodwill Court was a popular human interest radio court show of the mid-1930s that broadcast for over a year, sponsored by Chase & Sanborn Coffee. In 1936, it was ranked among the top ten radio programs. Although short-lived, the radio program represents the very first reality-based courtroom series and the second court show ever, only after The Court of Human Relations.

Defendants in real court cases told their stories and host A.L. Alexander stepped in to offer legal advice. The series premiered March 31, 1935, on WMCA in New York. The show moved to NBC September 20, 1936, airing as an hour-long show on Sundays at 8pm. As many as 15 cases would be heard during a single program. After the New York State Lawyers Association objected, the New York City Supreme Court ruled that lawyers could not give counsel on radio programs. This brought an end to the series, which aired its final episode on December 20, 1936.

Alexander had more success and a longer run when he returned to the air with the 1939-1952 A.L. Alexander's Mediation Board, another series dispensing advice to people with problems but minus the legal aspect. Alexander was once described by Time as "earnest, voluble, begoggled Albert Louis Alexander, onetime divinity student, actor, social worker, legman, radio announcer."

In 1959, Alexander briefly revived the concept on television as The Court of Human Relations, which aired from June 22 to August 14.

References

American talk radio programs
1930s American radio programs
1935 radio programme debuts
1936 radio programme endings
NBC radio programs